The 1992 Texas Rangers season saw the Rangers finishing fourth in the American League West with a record of 77 wins and 85 losses.

Offseason
 October 28, 1991: Steve Fireovid was signed as a free agent by the Rangers.
 December 7, 1991: Geno Petralli was signed as a free agent by the Rangers.
 January 3, 1992: Jeff Robinson was signed as a free agent by the Rangers.
 January 28, 1992: Mike Jeffcoat was signed as a free agent with the Texas Rangers.

Regular season

Season standings

Record vs. opponents

Opening Day lineup
 Brian Downing
 Monty Fariss
 Juan González
 José Guzmán
 Al Newman
 Rafael Palmeiro
 Dean Palmer
 Iván Rodríguez
 Rubén Sierra
 Dickie Thon

Notable transactions
 April 3, 1992: Al Newman was signed as a free agent with the Texas Rangers.
 May 29, 1992: Bill Haselman was selected off waivers from the Rangers by the Seattle Mariners.
 June 10, 1992: Jeff Robinson was selected off waivers from the Rangers by the Pittsburgh Pirates.
 June 19, 1992: Mario Díaz was signed as a free agent with the Texas Rangers.
 July 9, 1992: Bobby Valentine is fired after seven years as manager. Coach Toby Harrah is named as interim manager. The firing is announced by managing general partner of the Rangers, George W. Bush.
 August 31, 1992: Rubén Sierra, Jeff Russell, Bobby Witt, and cash were traded by the Rangers to the Oakland Athletics for José Canseco.

Roster

Player stats

Batting

Starters by position
Note: Pos = Position; G = Games played; AB = At bats; H = Hits; Avg. = Batting average; HR = Home runs; RBI = Runs batted in

Other batters
Note: G = Games played; AB = At bats; H = Hits; Avg. = Batting average; HR = Home runs; RBI = Runs batted in

Pitching

Starting pitchers
Note: G = Games pitched; IP = Innings pitched; W = Wins; L = Losses; ERA = Earned run average; SO = Strikeouts

Other pitchers
Note: G = Games pitched; IP = Innings pitched; W = Wins; L = Losses; ERA = Earned run average; SO = Strikeouts

Relief pitchers
Note: G = Games pitched; W = Wins; L = Losses; SV = Saves; ERA = Earned run average; SO = Strikeouts

Awards and honors
Juan González,  A.L. Home Run Champion
Juan González, Silver Slugger Award
Iván Rodríguez, C, Gold Glove
All-Star Game

Farm system

LEAGUE CHAMPIONS: Oklahoma City

Notes

References
1992 Texas Rangers at Baseball Reference
1992 Texas Rangers at Baseball Almanac

Texas Rangers seasons
Texas Rangers season
Texas Rangers